The whistling rain frog (Breviceps sopranus) is a species of frogs in the family Brevicipitidae.
It is found in South Africa, Eswatini, and possibly Mozambique.
Its natural habitats are temperate forests, dry savanna, moist savanna, and sandy shores.
It is threatened by habitat loss.

References

Breviceps
Frogs of Africa
Amphibians described in 2003
Taxonomy articles created by Polbot